Peggy Annette Whitson (born February 9, 1960) is an American biochemistry researcher, retired NASA astronaut, and former NASA Chief Astronaut. Whitson has a total of 665 days in space, more than any other woman or American. 

Her first space mission was in 2002: an extended stay aboard the International Space Station as a member of Expedition 5. On her second mission, Expedition 16, she became the first woman to command the ISS. In 2009, she became the first woman to serve as NASA's Chief Astronaut, the most senior position in the NASA Astronaut Corps. In 2017, Whitson became the first woman to command the International Space Station twice. Her 289-day flight was the longest single space flight by a woman until Christina Koch's 328-day flight.

Whitson holds the records for the oldest woman spacewalker and the most spacewalks by a woman. Whitson's cumulative EVA time is 60 hours, 21 minutes, which places her in fifth place for total EVA time. At age 57 on her final flight, she was the oldest woman ever in space at that time, and remains the oldest to fly in Earth orbit.

On June 15, 2018, Whitson retired from NASA. She later became a consultant for Axiom Space and has been selected to be commander of Axiom Mission 2.

Whitson was included in Time magazine's 100 Most Influential People of 2018.

Early life and background
Whitson grew up on a farm outside the town of Beaconsfield, Iowa, with her sister, Kathy, her brothers, Brian and Hugh, and her parents, Keith and Beth. Her parents were farmers. She decided to become an astronaut after she watched the first moon landing on television as a child in 1969. Whitson graduated from Mount Ayr Community High School in 1978 and received a Bachelor of Science degree in biology and chemistry from Iowa Wesleyan College in 1981. She then went on to earn her doctorate degree in biochemistry from Rice University in 1986, then continued at Rice as a Robert A Welch Post-doctoral Fellow until October 1986. She is married to Clarence F. Sams.

Research career
After her fellowship at Rice, she began working at Johnson Space Center in Houston, Texas, as a National Research Council Resident Research Associate. From April 1988 until September 1989, Whitson served as the Supervisor for the Biochemistry Research Group at KRUG International, a medical sciences contractor at NASA-JSC.

From 1991 through 1997, Whitson became an adjunct assistant professor in the Department of Internal Medicine and the Department of Human Biological Chemistry and Genetics at the University of Texas Medical Branch in Galveston, Texas. In 1997, Whitson began teaching as adjunct assistant professor at Rice University in the Maybee Laboratory for Biochemical and Genetic Engineering.

From 1992 to 1995, she served as project scientist for the Shuttle-Mir Program, then until 1996, as deputy division chief for the Medical Sciences division at the Johnson Space Center.

NASA career

From 1989 to 1993, Whitson worked as a research biochemist in the Biomedical Operations and Research Branch at NASA-JSC. From 1991 to 1993, she served as technical monitor of the Biochemistry Research Laboratories in the Biomedical Operations and Research Branch. From 1991 through 1992, she was the payload element developer for Bone Cell Research Experiment (E10) aboard SL-J (STS-47), and was a member of the US-USSR Joint Working Group in Space Medicine and Biology. In 1992, she was named the project scientist of the Shuttle-Mir Program (STS-60, STS-63, STS-71, Mir 18, Mir 19), and served in this capacity until the conclusion of the Phase 1A Program in 1995. From 1993 through 1996, Whitson held the additional responsibilities of the deputy division chief of the Medical Sciences Division at NASA-JSC. From 1995 to 1996, she served as co-chair of the U.S.-Russian Mission Science Working Group.

In April 1996, Whitson was selected as an astronaut candidate; she started training in August 1996. Upon completing the two years of training and evaluation, she was assigned technical duties in the Astronaut Office Operations Planning Branch, and served as the lead for the Crew Test Support Team in Russia from 1998 to 1999.  In June 2003, Whitson commanded the NEEMO 5 mission aboard the Aquarius underwater laboratory, living and working underwater for 14 days.  From November 2003 to March 2005, she served as deputy chief of the Astronaut Office. From March 2005 to November 2005, she served as chief of the Station Operations Branch, Astronaut Office.

Chief of the Astronaut Office
Whitson was appointed NASA Chief of the Astronaut Office in October 2009, replacing Steven W. Lindsey. Whitson was the first female, and first non-pilot to serve as Chief Astronaut. She resigned when she went back on active flight status in July 2012, replaced by Robert Behnken. Whitson has also served twice as the commander of the International Space Station.

Involvement with Axiom Space 
She is the Director of Human Space Flight for Axiom Space.
In January 2021 it was announced that she is back-up commander of Axiom Mission 1, raising the possibility that she could fly a later Axiom Space mission.

Commander of Axiom Mission 2 
In May 2021, Whitson was confirmed as commander of the second Axiom mission Axiom Mission 2.

Spaceflight experience

Expedition 5

The Expedition 5 crew launched on June 5, 2002, aboard STS-111 and docked with the International Space Station on June 7, 2002. During her six-month stay aboard the Space Station, Whitson installed the Mobile Base System, the S1 truss segment, and the P1 truss segment using the space station remote manipulator system; performed a 4-hour and 25 minute spacewalk in a Russian Orlan space suit to install micrometeoroid shielding on the Zvezda Service Module; and activated and checked out the Microgravity Sciences Glovebox, a facility class payload rack.

Whitson was named the first NASA science officer during her stay, and she conducted 21 investigations in human life sciences and microgravity sciences, as well as commercial payloads. The Expedition 5 crew returned to Earth aboard STS-113 on December 7, 2002. Completing her first flight, Whitson logged 184 days, 22 hours and 14 minutes in space.

Expedition 16

Her second mission, Expedition 16, launched October 10, 2007, on Soyuz TMA-11. Along with her Expedition 16 crew member Yuri Malenchenko and spaceflight participant Yi So-yeon, she returned to Earth in Soyuz TMA-11 on April 19, 2008. The re-entry was remarkable for the failure of the Soyuz propulsion module to separate properly, and the subsequent "ballistic reentry" which subjected the crew to forces about eight times that of Earth surface gravity. She spent 191 days, 19 hrs and 8 mins in space on this mission.

On December 18, 2007, during the fourth spacewalk of Expedition 16 to inspect the S4 starboard Solar Alpha Rotary Joint (SARJ), the ground team in Mission Control informed Whitson that she had become the female astronaut with the most cumulative EVA time in NASA history, as well as the most EVAs, with her fifth EVA. Three hours and 37 minutes into the spacewalk, Whitson surpassed NASA astronaut Sunita Williams with a total time at that point of 29 hours and 18 minutes. At the completion of Whitson's fifth EVA, the 100th in support of ISS assembly and maintenance, Whitson's cumulative EVA time became 32 hours, and 36 minutes, which placed her in 20th place for total EVA time.  Her sixth spacewalk, also during Expedition 16, brought her cumulative EVA time to 39 hours, 46 minutes, which ranked her 23rd for total EVA time as of November 2009.

Expedition 50/51/52

Peggy Whitson arrived at the International Space Station on November 19, 2016, on Expedition 50/51, which was launched on November 17, 2016, from the Baikonur cosmodrome in Kazakhstan. She became the commander of Expedition 51. With the launch of Expedition 50/51 with her on it, Whitson, at age 56, became the oldest woman to fly into space. During the mission, she broke the record for cumulative time spent in space by a U.S. astronaut, surpassing the previous record of 534 days set by Jeff Williams. In early April 2017, her mission was extended by an additional 3 months at the International Space Station. On September 3, she returned in a previously vacant seat on the Soyuz capsule accompanied by NASA's Jack Fischer and Fyodor Yurchikhin of Roscosmos.

In January 2017, Whitson performed her seventh EVA. along with Expedition 50 commander Shane Kimbrough. During the EVA, they installed three new adapter plates and hooked up electrical connectors preparing the way to replace the ISS batteries. The EVA lasted 6 hours and 32 minutes. Whitson now holds the record for the oldest female spacewalker, and is now tied with the record for total spacewalks by a woman (seven), along with Sunita Williams. After completion of the seventh EVA, Whitson's cumulative EVA time became 46 hours, 18 minutes, which placed her in 13th place for total EVA time.

On April 24, 2017, Whitson officially broke the record for longest amount of time spent in space by any NASA astronaut.  As a result, she received a televised phone call from the Oval Office from US President Donald Trump, the President's daughter Ivanka, and fellow astronaut Kathleen Rubins. When interviewed on that day she declared 'It is actually a huge honor to break a record like this, but it is an honor for me back to be representing all the folks at NASA'.

On May 12, 2017, Whitson performed her ninth career EVA with Jack Fischer. After a short delay due to leaking equipment, they replaced an avionics box on the starboard truss called an ExPRESS Logistics Carrier (ELC), a storage platform. The duration was 4 hours and 13 minutes, and it was the 200th EVA to be performed on the ISS.

On May 23, 2017, Whitson performed her tenth career EVA with Fischer. They replaced a backup multiplexer-demultiplexer (MDM) unit that had failed on May 20, 2017. The duration was 2 hours and 46 minutes, making Whitson's cumulative EVA time more than 60 hours, placing her third on the list for most EVA time.

On June 1, 2017, Whitson passed over the command of the International Space Station to Fyodor Yurchikhin, who was named commander of Expedition 52 until he, Whitson and Jack Fischer returned to Earth aboard Soyuz MS-04 in September 2017.

Whitson returned to Earth on September 3, 2017, after she accrued a total of 665 days in space over the course of her career. This total was more time in space than any other woman worldwide and any other American. As of April 2021 she is ranked ninth on the list of total time spent in space. The duration of her stay in space during expeditions 50/51/52 was 289 days, 5 hours and 1 minute. In June 2020, Whitson was a guest (along with two imposters) on an ABC-TV To Tell the Truth episode in which Patti LaBelle correctly selected her as the record-holding time in space astronaut.

Awards and honors

 NASA Outstanding Leadership Medal (2006)
 NASA Space Flight Medal (2002)
 Patents awarded (1997, 1998)
 Group Achievement Award for Shuttle-Mir Program (1996)
 American Astronautical Society Randolph Lovelace II Award (1995)
 NASA Tech Brief Award (1995)
 NASA Space Act Board Award (1995, 1998)
 NASA Silver Snoopy Award (1995)
 NASA Exceptional Service Medal (1995, 2003, 2006)
 NASA Space Act Award for Patent Application
 NASA Certificate of Commendation (1994)
 NASA Sustained Superior Performance Award (1990)
 Medal "For Merit in Space Exploration" (Russia, April 12, 2011) – for outstanding contribution to the development of international cooperation in manned space flight
 Krug International Merit Award (1989)
 NASA-JSC National Research Council Resident Research Associate (1986–1988)
 Robert A. Welch Postdoctoral Fellowship (1985–1986)
 Robert A. Welch Predoctoral Fellowship (1982–1985)
 Summa cum laude from Iowa Wesleyan College (1981)
 President's Honor Roll (1978–1981)
 Orange van Calhoun Scholarship (1980)
 State of Iowa Scholar (1979)
 Academic Excellence Award (1978)
 Included in the Time 100 list of influential people for 2018.
 Women in Space Science Award (2019).
International Air and Space Hall of Fame (2018)
"Women on the Move" Award (2010)
Space Flight Award (2017)
She was recognized as one of the BBC's 100 women of 2017.

References

External links

 
 NASA biography
 Spacefacts biography of Peggy Whitson
 NASA Expedition 16
 Peggy Whitson   Video produced by Makers: Women Who Make America

1960 births
Living people
American astronauts
Aquanauts
Crew members of the International Space Station
Women astronauts
Commanders of the International Space Station
Iowa Wesleyan University alumni
People from Ringgold County, Iowa
Rice University alumni
Recipients of the NASA Exceptional Service Medal
Recipients of the Medal "For Merit in Space Exploration"
BBC 100 Women
Space Shuttle program astronauts
Axiom Space
Spacewalkers
Iowa Women's Hall of Fame Inductees